Kentuck Knob, also known as the Hagan House, is a house designed by the American architect Frank Lloyd Wright in rural Stewart Township near the village of Chalk Hill, Fayette County, Pennsylvania, USA,  southeast of Pittsburgh. It was designated a National Historic Landmark in 2000 for the quality of its architecture.

Overview
Kentuck Knob is a one-story, 2,300 square foot dwelling situated on Chestnut Ridge, the westernmost ridge of Pennsylvania's Allegheny Mountains. The house stands at the end of a driveway south of Pennsylvania State Route 2010. The home is recessed into the southern side of Kentuck Knob's  peak with a mountainous  surrounding it that originally composed a farm. 

The Hagans, I.N. and Bernardine, planted much of the hilltop property with tree seedlings to provide both privacy and a wind break. The mountain summit offers a sweeping view of the Youghiogheny River gorge as well as surrounding hills and farmland. The house is only four miles south of Wright's most famous house, Fallingwater (1935), also in Pennsylvania's Laurel Highlands region.

Description
Wright employed tidewater red cypress, glass, and native sandstone to build the home, and capped it with a copper roof at a cost of $96,000.

At 86, and hard at work on the Guggenheim Museum in New York, the Beth Sholom Synagogue in Elkins Park, Pennsylvania, and about 12 residential homes, Wright said he could "shake it (Kentuck Knob) out of his sleeve at will", never even setting foot on the site, except for a short visit during the construction phase. This was one of the last homes to be completed by Wright.

The crescent-shaped house curls around a west-facing courtyard, blending into the contours of the land. The anchor of the design is a hexagonal stone core that rises from the hipped roof at the intersection of the living and bedroom wings. 

The walls of the flat-roofed carport and studio burrow into the knob and define the courtyard's eastern side. A stone planter terminates the low retaining wall on the west side of the courtyard, and it features a copper light fixture accented with a triangular-shaped shade. 

To the south, the house extends beyond the hillside on 10" thick stone-faced concrete ramparts. As with other houses Wright designed during this period, the Kentuck Knob plan is based upon a module system, in this case an equilateral triangle measuring 4'-6" to a side creating an outside 240° L-plan house.

Forgoing the site's uppermost location and its commanding views, Wright characteristically chose a challenging and less obvious site immediately south of the site's hilltop, nestling the house into the hillside (allowing the building to grow out of rather than dominate its setting) and orienting the house to the south and west for optimal solar exposure.

History
The Hagan House began in 1953 when the Hagans, owners of a major dairy company in Western Pennsylvania (Hagan Ice Cream, now owned by Kemps), purchased  of mountain land east of their native Uniontown, the county seat. As friends of the Kaufmanns, owners of nearby Fallingwater on Bear Run, the Hagans asked their architect Frank Lloyd Wright, then 86 years old, to design a deluxe Usonian home for them. The house was completed in 1956, and the Hagans lived at Kentuck Knob for almost 30 years.

In 1986, Lord Palumbo of London, UK, bought the property for $600,000 as a vacation home. Since 1996, the Palumbo family has balanced their occupancy with a public tour program, a method of historic property management more common to their native Britain than to the United States.

The Palumbos added a sculpture meadow to the site near the base of the mountain, where 35 sculptures by artists such as Andy Goldsworthy, Harry Bertoia, Claes Oldenburg, Ray Smith, Michael Warren, Katherine Gili and Sir Anthony Caro are displayed. Found object art pieces include a French pissoir, red British telephone boxes, and a large, vertically upright concrete slab from the Berlin Wall. The meadow is reached by a walking path through woods from either the house or the visitors center.

The name Kentuck Knob is credited to the late 18th-century settler David Askins, who intended to move from Western Pennsylvania to Kentucky, but then reconsidered and remained at this very property, naming his tract of land Little Kentuck. It subsequently became known as the Kentuck District of Stewart Township, one of the county's several rural mountainous townships. Ever since, the summit of the property has been called Kentuck Knob.

References

Further reading

 S.377

External links

Official Kentuck Knob website
County website on historic Kentuck Knob
Official Western Pennsylvania Conservancy website
[ National Register nomination form]

Frank Lloyd Wright buildings
Houses in Fayette County, Pennsylvania
Historic house museums in Pennsylvania
Museums in Fayette County, Pennsylvania
Houses completed in 1956
Houses on the National Register of Historic Places in Pennsylvania
National Historic Landmarks in Pennsylvania
Laurel Highlands
Gardens in Pennsylvania
Sculpture gardens, trails and parks in the United States
Modernist architecture in Pennsylvania
National Register of Historic Places in Fayette County, Pennsylvania